Roderick Macdonald may refer to:

 Roderick MacDonald (musician), principal trumpet of the Leipzig Gewandhaus Orchestra
 Roderick Macdonald, Lord Uist (born 1951), Scottish judge
 Roddy (R.S.) MacDonald (Roderick S. MacDonald, born 1956),  Scottish pipe major and music composer previously based in Australia
 Roderick Macdonald (politician) (1840–1894), British Member of Parliament for Ross and Cromarty, 1885–1892
 Roderick A. Macdonald (1948–2014), Canadian legal scholar
 Roderick Charles MacDonald (1885–1978), merchant and politician in British Columbia, Canada
 Roderick Douglas Macdonald (1921–2001), Royal Navy admiral
 Roderick Lewis Macdonald (born 1957), Scottish Labour politician, Member of the Scottish Parliament (MSP) for North East Scotland 2011–2021

See also
 Roderick McDonald (died 1885), Canadian physician and politician
 Roderick McDonald (basketball) (1945–2015), American basketball player